John Bailey Denton (1814–1893) M. Inst. C.E.; F.G.S., was a British surveyor and civil engineer.

Biography 
In addition, 9s (£ at present worth as of ) was calculated by Dr. Augustus Voelcker, the consulting chemist for the Royal Agricultural Society of England, to be the annual value  of ammonia and phosphates excreted per head.

Honorary 
Honorary member of the R.A.S.S. of Denmark, Sweden, and Hanover.

List of publications 
This list is taken from ODNB and Works by Mr Bailey-Denton, M. Inst. C.E.; F.G.S., in Sewage Disposal (1895).

 (1842) What Can now be Done for British Agriculture?
 (1849) Sewerage of London
 (1854) Land Drainage and drainage Systems
 (1855) Underdrainage of Land; its progress and results (Society of Arts Medal)
 (1857) Road-Making (Prize Essay)
 (1858) The effect of Underdrainage on Arterial Channels and Outfalls
 (1863) The Discharge from Underdrainage (Telford Medal, Institution of Civil Engineers.)
 (1864) The Farm Homesteads of England
 (1865) The importance of Shelter and Covering at Homesteads in certain Districts of Great Britain
 (1865) The Marshes of South Italy
 (1866) The Water Question
 (1868) The Agricultural Labourer
 (1869) Sanitary Works
 (1870) Sewage Farming
 (1871) Sewage the Fertilizer of Land, and Land the Purifier of Sewage
 (1872) Underdrainage and the steps taken to develop and maintain its effects
 (1873) Intermittent Downward Filtration and Irrigation
 (1874) Sanitary Science applied to Towns and Rural Districts
 (1874) Storage of Water
 (1877) Sanitary Engineering
 (1881) Sewage Disposal

References

External links
 

1814 births
1893 deaths
British surveyors
British civil engineers